Daiki Kishi (岸大貴, born 22 September 1994) is a Japanese trampoline gymnast. He competed in the 2020 Summer Olympics.

References

1994 births
Living people
Japanese male trampolinists
Gymnasts at the 2020 Summer Olympics
Olympic gymnasts of Japan
21st-century Japanese people